Khilpara is a village in Munshiganj District in central Bangladesh. It is a part of the Dhaka Division and borders the Dhaka District. It has the same name as Khilpara, India in the South Tripura district.

Mosques 

 Purbo Khilpara Jame Masjid
 Khilpara Baitul Aman Jame Masjid
 Khilpara Cabra Masjid

Population 
The population is 3,172.

Roads

Main roads 
 Tongibari - Sonarang - Betka Road
 Natun Bazar-Betka Chowrastha Road

Branch roads 
 Natun Bazar - Paschim Khilpara Road
 Khilpara - Paschim Khilpara Road
 Purba Khilpara Road
 Khilpara - Paikpara Road

Bridges 
 Main Khilpara Bridge
 Pascim Khilpara Bridge
 Ghusal Bari Bridge

Key locations 
 Baat Tala
 Jaam Paar
 Mahila Madrasa

Bus stops 
 Mahila Madrasa Bus Stop

Education

Government primary schools

References 

Villages in Munshiganj District